Devin Cole (born October 1, 1976) is an American mixed martial artist. He is a veteran of the Seattle Tiger Sharks and Portland Wolfpack in the IFL, and has also competed in the WEC, Strikeforce, the World Series of Fighting, and Shark Fights.

Early life
Cole has wrestled his entire life, from third grade through college. In 2001 he received All-American honors while leading Southern Oregon University to a national championship. While coaching at Southern Oregon University that Cole coached fellow IFL fighter and TUF contestant Mike Whitehead. He credits Whitehead for getting him involved in MMA.

MMA career
On July 9, 2005, Devin began his pro MMA career at the SF11: Rumble on the Rose Garden event, where he defeated South African kickboxer Rico Hattingh by unanimous decision. Cole went on to compile a professional record of 18-8-1 including notable wins over Mike Kyle and Travis Wiuff before signing with Strikeforce.

Strikeforce
Cole made his Strikeforce debut at Strikeforce Challengers: Woodley vs. Saffiedine on January 7, 2011, in Nashville, Tennessee, against Daniel Cormier. He lost the fight via unanimous decision.

Cole rebounded from his loss to Cormier on July 22, 2011, at Strikeforce Challengers: Voelker vs. Bowling III, defeating newcomer Shawn Jordan via unanimous decision (29-28, 29-28, 29-28).

Cole won for the second consecutive time in Strikeforce via unanimous decision over Gabriel Salinas-Jones on December 17, 2011, at Strikeforce: Melendez vs. Masvidal.

World Series of Fighting
Cole headlined the debut event from the World Series of Fighting against former UFC Heavyweight Champion Andrei Arlovski on November 3, 2012, in Las Vegas, Nevada.

Personal life
Devin married his wife Lyndsey on June 4, 2005, in Ashland, OR.

Arrest
On June 14, 2008, Cole was arrested by the Medford, Oregon police department and charged with first-degree rape, two counts of first-degree sodomy and two counts of first-degree sexual penetration. The charges were later reduced to assault in the fourth degree and sexual harassment, to which Cole pleaded guilty. He was sentenced to 60 days in jail. The incident was cited as the reason why Cole's planned UFC debut at UFC on FOX 4 in August 2012 against Travis Browne was scrapped, despite being among Strikeforce's heavyweight roster (and coming off of two wins) when their heavyweight division was folded at the end of 2011.

Mixed martial arts record

|-
| Loss
| align=center| 20–10–1
| Andrei Arlovski
| TKO (punches)
| World Series of Fighting 1
| 
| align=center| 1
| align=center| 2:37
| Las Vegas, Nevada, United States
| 
|-
| Win
| align=center| 20–9–1
| Gabriel Salinas-Jones
| Decision (unanimous)
| Strikeforce: Melendez vs. Masvidal
| 
| align=center| 3
| align=center| 5:00
| San Diego, California, United States
| 
|-
| Win
| align=center| 19–9–1
| Shawn Jordan
| Decision (unanimous)
| Strikeforce Challengers: Voelker vs. Bowling III
| 
| align=center| 3
| align=center| 5:00
| Las Vegas, Nevada, United States
| 
|-
| Loss
| align=center| 18–9–1
| Daniel Cormier
| Decision (unanimous)
| Strikeforce Challengers: Woodley vs. Saffiedine
| 
| align=center| 3
| align=center| 5:00
| Nashville, Tennessee, United States
| 
|-
| Loss
| align=center| 18–8–1
| Aaron Rosa
| Decision (unanimous)
| Shark Fights 13: Jardine vs Prangley
| 
| align=center| 3
| align=center| 5:00
| Amarillo, Texas, United States
| 
|-
| Win
| align=center| 18–7–1
| Trevor Smith
| TKO (punches)
| Rumble on the Ridge 12
| 
| align=center| 1
| align=center| 0:31
| Snoqualmie, Washington, United States
| 
|-
| Win
| align=center| 17–7–1
| Jason Riley
| TKO (punches)
| UMMAXX 10: Collision Course
| 
| align=center| 1
| align=center| 0:14
| Euclid, Ohio, United States
| 
|-
| Win
| align=center| 16–7–1
| Garren Smith
| TKO (punches)
| Brass Knuckle Promotions
| 
| align=center| 1
| align=center| 2:40
| Medford, Oregon, United States
| 
|-
| Win
| align=center| 15–7–1
| Josh Bennett
| TKO (punches)
| Brass Knuckle Promotions
| 
| align=center| 2
| align=center| 1:58
| Medford, Oregon, United States
| 
|-
| Win
| align=center| 14–7–1
| Mike Hayes
| Decision (unanimous)
| Rumble on the Ridge 4
| 
| align=center| 3
| align=center| 3:00
| Snoqualmie, Washington, United States
| 
|-
| Draw
| align=center| 13–7–1
| Mike Hayes
| Draw (majority)
| Fight Night: Bikes & Brawls
| 
| align=center| 3
| align=center| 5:00
| Canyonville, Oregon, United States
| 
|-
| Win
| align=center| 13–7
| D.J. Linderman
| Decision (unanimous)
| BKP - Cinco de Massacre
| 
| align=center| 3
| align=center| 3:00
| Medford, Oregon, United States
| 
|-
| Loss
| align=center| 12–7
| D.J. Linderman
| Submission (rear-naked choke)
| BKP - Night of Champions
| 
| align=center| 1
| align=center| 4:28
| Medford, Oregon, United States
| 
|-
| Win
| align=center| 12–6
| Vince Lucero
| TKO (punches)
| PFC 8: A Night of Champions
| 
| align=center| 1
| align=center| 1:17
| Lemoore, California, United States
| 
|-
| Loss
| align=center| 11–6
| Orvil Palmer
| Decision (split)
| IFL: Everett
| 
| align=center| 3
| align=center| 4:00
| Everett, Washington, United States
| 
|-
| Win
| align=center| 11–5
| Bryan Vetell
| KO (punches)
| IFL: Connecticut
| 
| align=center| 2
| align=center| 1:42
| Uncasville, Connecticut, United States
| 
|-
| Loss
| align=center| 10–5
| Rafael Cavalcante
| TKO (punches)
| IFL: Atlanta
| 
| align=center| 2
| align=center| 0:26
| Atlanta, Georgia, United States
| 
|-
| Loss
| align=center| 10–4
| Ben Rothwell
| KO (head kick)
| IFL: Championship Final
| 
| align=center| 1
| align=center| 3:16
| Uncasville, Connecticut, United States
| 
|-
| Loss
| align=center| 10–3
| Krzysztof Soszynski
| Submission (armbar)
| IFL: World Championship Semifinals
| 
| align=center| 2
| align=center| 1:14
| Portland, Oregon, United States
| 
|-
| Loss
| align=center| 10–2
| Allan Goes
| Submission (guillotine choke)
| IFL: Portland
| 
| align=center| 1
| align=center| 2:05
| Portland, Oregon, United States
| 
|-
| Win
| align=center| 10–1
| Travis Wiuff
| Decision (unanimous)
| IFL: Championship 2006
| 
| align=center| 3
| align=center| 4:00
| Atlantic City, New Jersey, United States
| 
|-
| Win
| align=center| 9–1
| Carlos Cline
| Decision (unanimous)
| IFL: Legends Championship 2006
| 
| align=center| 3
| align=center| 4:00
| Atlantic City, New Jersey, United States
| 
|-
| Win
| align=center| 8–1
| Mike Kyle
| TKO (punches)
| WEC 18: Unfinished Business
| 
| align=center| 2
| align=center| 2:56
| Lemoore, California, United States
| 
|-
| Loss
| align=center| 7–1
| Jeff Monson
| Decision (unanimous)
| XFC: Dome of Destruction 3
| 
| align=center| 3
| align=center| 5:00
| Tacoma, Washington, United States
| 
|-
| Win
| align=center| 7–0
| Ulysses Castro
| TKO (punches)
| National Fighting Challenge 4
| 
| align=center| 1
| align=center| 2:42
| Vancouver, British Columbia, Canada
| 
|-
| Win
| align=center| 6–0
| Brian Stromberg
| Submission (guillotine choke)
| UCF: Night of Champions
| 
| align=center| N/A
| align=center| N/A
| Medford, Oregon, United States
| 
|-
| Win
| align=center| 5–0
| Rico Hattingh
| Decision (unanimous)
| SF 11: Rumble at the Rose Garden
| 
| align=center| 3
| align=center| 5:00
| Portland, Oregon, United States
| 
|-
| Win
| align=center| 4–0
| Luis Haro
| Submission
| UCF: Battle at the Border 2
| 
| align=center| 3
| align=center| N/A
| Medford, Oregon, United States
| 
|-
| Win
| align=center| 3–0
| Manuel Alvarez
| TKO (punches)
| UCF: Battle at the Border 1
| 
| align=center| N/A
| align=center| N/A
| Medford, Oregon, United States
| 
|-
| Win
| align=center| 2–0
| Josh Bennett
| TKO (punches)
| FCFF: Fight Night 4
| 
| align=center| 1
| align=center| N/A
| Medford, Oregon, United States
| 
|-
| Win
| align=center| 1–0
| Delon Williams
| Submission
| FCFF: Rumble at the Roseland 9
| 
| align=center| 2
| align=center| 2:07
| Portland, Oregon, United States
|

References

External links

Living people
1976 births
American male mixed martial artists
Mixed martial artists from Oregon
Heavyweight mixed martial artists
Mixed martial artists utilizing collegiate wrestling
American male sport wrestlers
Southern Oregon University alumni